Proeme is a genus of beetles in the family Cerambycidae, containing the following species:

 Proeme asimoni Touroult, Dalens & Tavakilian, 2010
 Proeme bella Martins, 1978
 Proeme bucki (Melzer, 1931)
 Proeme cyanescens (Aurivillius, 1910)
 Proeme latipennis (Lane, 1973)
 Proeme lyciformis Martins, 1978
 Proeme plagiata (Buquet, 1860)
 Proeme rufoscapus (Aurivillius, 1910)
 Proeme seabrai Martins, 1978

References

Xystrocerini